Boldklubben 1908 (B.1908 for short) is a Danish football club based in the district of Amager Vest, Copenhagen. The club's first team play in Denmark Series, the fifth tier of Danish football. The club play their home matches at Sundby Idrætspark, which has a capacity of 7,200. Founded in 1908, the club was a part of Danish second-tier football through the 1930s, had a spell in the top-flight War Tournaments during World War II, before experiencing a revival in the 1980s and 1990s, entering the third-tier Danish 2nd Division.

History
The club was founded on 24 May 1908 by several boys among them the four Jansen brothers - Hans, Jens, Crilles and Edvard - aged 10 to 15 years old, choosing Harry Osbeck as the first chairman. The club's first match was won 3-0 against Thingvalla. In 1912 the team was co-founder of regional football association, Amager Boldspil-Union (ABU), winning the first tournament under the new association's auspices.

Team colours and crest
Boldklubben 1908's team colours are black and white. The club's current logo was introduced in May 2014 and resembles the club's first logo.

Club's honours

Domestic

National leagues 
 Denmark Series
 Runners-up (1): 1983
 Group 1 Winners (3): 1983, 1995, 2008–09

Regional leagues 
 Copenhagen Series (DBUK level 1)
 Winners (4): 1944–45, 1945–46, 1955–56, 1982
 Runner-up (7): 1947–48, 1948–49, 1958, 1960, 1963, 1969, 1993
 Amagermesterskabet (ABU level 1)
 Winners (1): 1912

Cups 
 Forstadsklubbernes Pokalturnering
 Winners (2): 1918, 1919
 KBUs Sommerpokalturnering
 Winners (3): 1933, 1935, 1940
 Runners-up (1): 1934
 Fælledklubbernes Pokalturnering
 Winners (1): 1927
 Amager Boldspil-Unions Pokalturnering (ABU)
 Winners (1): 1927, 1928

Achievements

4 seasons in the Highest Danish League
8 seasons in the Second Highest Danish League
13 seasons in the Third Highest Danish League

References

External links
 Official website 

1908
Football clubs in Copenhagen
1908 establishments in Denmark